Bates is an unincorporated community in Scott County, Arkansas, United States.  It is the location or nearest community of Bates School, at 1074 Bates School Rd., which is listed on the U.S. National Register of Historic Places.

History
Bates was founded in 1907, soon after the railroad was extended to that point, and named after the local Bates family.

References

Unincorporated communities in Scott County, Arkansas
Unincorporated communities in Arkansas